Events from the year 1796 in France.

Incumbents
 The French Directory

Events
9 March - Widow Joséphine de Beauharnais marries General Napoléon Bonaparte.
12 April - Battle of Montenotte, French victory over Austria and Sardinian forces. Napoleon Bonaparte's first victory as an army commander.
13 April - Battle of Millesimo, French victory against Austrian and Sardinian forces.
14 April-15 April - Second Battle of Dego, French victory over Austro-Sardinian forces.
21 April - Battle of Mondovì, French victory over the Kingdom of Sardinia.
10 May - Battle of Lodi, French victory over Austria.
15 May - French troops take Milan.
5 July - Battle of Rastatt, French victory against Austria.
3-4 August - 2nd Battle of Lonato, French victory over Austria.
5 August - Battle of Castiglione, French victory over Austria.
11 August - Battle of Neresheim, French victory over Austria.
19 August - Second Treaty of San Ildefonso, signed by France and Spain, to ally against Great Britain.
24 August - Battle of Amberg, Austrian victory over French forces.
3 September - Battle of Würzburg, Austrian victory over France.
4 September - Battle of Rovereto, French victory against Austria.
8 September - Battle of Bassano, French victory over Austrian forces.
15 November-17 November - Battle of the Bridge of Arcole, French victory over Austria.

Births
8 February - Barthélemy-Prosper Enfantin, social reformer (died 1864)
17 February - Louis Eugène Marie Bautain, philosopher and theologian (died 1867)
22 February - Alexis Bachelot, Roman Catholic priest and Prefect Apostolic of the Sandwich Islands (present Hawaii) (died 1837)
17 March - Jean-François Bayard, playwright (died 1853)
24 March - Zulma Carraud, children's author (died 1889)
31 March - Philippe Buchez, author and politician (died 1866)
1 June - Nicolas Léonard Sadi Carnot, physicist and military engineer (died 1832)
24 June - Charles Cousin-Montauban, Comte de Palikao, general and statesman (died 1878)
17 July - Jean-Baptiste-Camille Corot, painter (died 1875)
24 September - Antoine-Louis Barye, sculptor (died 1875)
6 November - Jean-Claude-Léonard Baveux, priest and missionary in Canada (died 1865)
21 November - Jean Zuléma Amussat, surgeon (died 1856)

Full date unknown
Auguste-Marseille Barthélemy, satirical poet (died 1867)

Deaths
1 January - Alexandre-Théophile Vandermonde, musician and chemist (born 1735)
8 January - Jean-Marie Collot d'Herbois, actor, dramatist, essayist, and revolutionary (born 1749)
23 February - Jean-Nicolas Stofflet, leader of Revolt in the Vendée (born 1751)
6 March - Guillaume Thomas François Raynal, writer (born 1711)
26 March - François de Charette, soldier and politician (born 1763)
1 May - Alexandre Guy Pingré, astronomer and naval geographer (born 1711)
30 July - Nicolas de Pigage, architect (born 1723)
21 September - François Séverin Marceau-Desgraviers, General (born 1769)
27 September - Jean-Bernard Gauthier de Murnan, General (born 1748)
16 October - Antoine-Joseph Pernety, writer (born 1716)

Full date unknown
Jean Avisse, furniture maker (born 1723)
Pierre-Marie-Jérôme Trésaguet, engineer (born 1716)

See also

References

1790s in France